is an artistic genre that puts its focus on eroticism, sexual corruption, and decadence. As a term, it is used to denote something that is both erotic and grotesque.

The "grotesqueness" implied in the term refers to things that are malformed, unnatural, or horrific. Items that are pornographic and bloody are not necessarily , and vice versa. The term is often mistaken by Western audiences to mean "gore" – depictions of horror, blood, and guts.

History
 art experienced a boom when , a subculture characterized as a "prewar, bourgeois cultural phenomenon that devoted itself to explorations of the deviant, the bizarre, and the ridiculous", manifested in the popular culture of Taishō Tokyo during the 1920s. Writer Ian Buruma describes the social atmosphere of the time as "a skittish, sometimes nihilistic hedonism that brings Weimar Berlin to mind." Its roots go back to artists such as Tsukioka Yoshitoshi, who, besides erotic shunga, also produced woodblock prints showing decapitations and acts of violence from Japanese history. Ukiyo-e artists such as Utagawa Kuniyoshi presented similar themes with bondage, rape and erotic crucifixion.

's first distinct appearance began in 1920s and 1930s Japanese literature. The Sada Abe Incident of 1936, where a woman strangled her lover to death and castrated his corpse, struck a chord with the  movement but shortly led to the censorship of related media. Other similar activities and movements were generally suppressed in Japan during World War II, but re-emerged in the postwar period, especially in manga and music.

Over time, the  movement's influence expanded into parts of Japanese theatre, art, manga, and eventually into film and music.

Later influences
 is also an element of many Japanese horror films and pink films, particularly of the 1960s and 1970s. Examples include Teruo Ishii's Shogun's Joy of Torture (1968) and Horrors of Malformed Men (1969) and Yasuzo Masumura's Blind Beast (1969), the latter two based on the works of Edogawa Ranpo.

There are modern  artists, some of whom cite  as an influence on their work. These artists explore the macabre intermingled with sexual overtones. Often the erotic element, even when not explicit, is merged with grotesque themes and features similar to the works of H. R. Giger. Others produce  as a genre of Japanese pornography and hentai involving blood, gore, disfiguration, violence, mutilation, urine, enemas, or feces. This genre of pornography is colloquially known among internet circles simply as "guro".

Well-known  manga artists include Suehiro Maruo, Hajime Yamano, Jun Hayami, Go Nagai, Shintaro Kago, Toshio Maeda, Henmaru Machino, Yamamoto Takato, Horihone Saizō, Katsuhisa Kigitsu, Uziga Waita, and Rei Mikamoto.

In music
Western visual kei fans assumed their theme was a subgenre of visual kei and linked it with other similar bands.

The 2014 Flying Lotus album You're Dead! prominently featured  artwork from Japanese manga artist Shintaro Kago on the cover and inner sleeve, with further art being utilised in the accompanying live show. Much of the drawings featured men and women being disfigured and mutilated in unrealistic, hi-tech ways, with a significant amount of gore and nudity.

See also
Grotesque
Urotsukidoji

Marquis de Sade
Mnemosyne (TV series)

Tokyo Red Hood
List of genres

Notes

 Aguilar, Carlos (editor). Bizarre Sinema! Japanese Ero Gro & Pinku Eiga 1956–1979. Firenze, Italy: Glittering Images, 2005. .
 McLelland, Mark. "A Short History of 'Hentai'"  (PDF version). Intersections: Gender, History and Culture in the Asian Context, issue 12 (January 2006). .
 Silverberg, Miriam Rom. Galley copy of the table of contents and preface for Erotic Grotesque Nonsense: The Mass Culture of Japanese Modern Times. December 12, 2005.
 Silverberg, Miriam Rom. Erotic Grotesque Nonsense: The Mass Culture of Japanese Modern Times . Asia Pacific modern, 1. Berkeley: University of California Press, 2006. .

 
Visual arts genres
Arts in Japan
Hentai
Japanese pornography
Visual kei
Erotic horror
Japanese sex terms